Real Betis C was a Spanish football club based in Seville, in the autonomous community of Andalusia. It was the second reserve team of Real Betis, behind Real Betis B, and folded in 2011 due to economic problems.

Season to season

References

External links
Official website 
La Preferente team profile 

Real Betis
Football clubs in Andalusia
Association football clubs disestablished in 2011
2011 disestablishments in Spain
1962 establishments in Spain
Association football clubs established in 1962